Karyn Cecilia Velez (March 5, 1990 – August 12, 2013) was a Filipino-American badminton player who competed in international level events.

Velez died of serious injuries in a head-on car crash aged 23. The van driver who struck her vehicle pleaded guilty for homicide after he was charged for reckless driving.

Before her death, she was aiming to qualify for the 2016 Summer Olympics.

References

1990 births
2013 deaths
Road incident deaths in the Philippines
Sportspeople from Philadelphia
American female badminton players
Filipino female badminton players
American sportspeople of Filipino descent
21st-century American women